Anthurium argyrostachyum is a species of plant in the genus Anthurium native to Ecuador and Colombia. Growing as a small shrub or an epiphyte, it is best recognized by its foliage that has triangular or arrowhead-like shape, a long central lobe, and parallel veins. It is a member of the section Polyneurium, and is thus related to Anthurium corrugatum, Anthurium panduriforme, and others that share its parallel venation and other characteristics.

References

argyrostachyum
Plants described in 1901